Fort Greene Historic District is a national historic district in Fort Greene, Brooklyn, New York, New York.  It consists of 1,158 contributing buildings, two contributing sites, one contributing object, and two contributing structures.  It is characterized by a concentration of architecturally distinguished three and four story townhouses developed speculatively and built between 1840 and 1890. Most are faced in sandstone and exhibit characteristics of the Greek Revival, Italianate, Second Empire, and Neo-Grec styles.  It includes the 33-acre Fort Greene Park designed by Frederick Law Olmsted and Calvert Vaux in 1868.  In the park is a column memorializing Revolutionary War soldiers (Prison Ship Martyrs' Monument) that was designed by McKim, Mead, and White and erected in 1908.  The park was built on the site of fortifications built in 1776 and 1814.  Also located in the district is the Brooklyn Academy of Music.

It was listed on the National Register of Historic Places in 1983 and expanded in 1984.

References

Historic districts on the National Register of Historic Places in Brooklyn
New York City designated historic districts
New York City Designated Landmarks in Brooklyn
Italianate architecture in New York City
Fort Greene, Brooklyn